Kali Dora Flanagan (born September 19, 1995) is an American ice hockey player for the American national team and the Boston Pride of the PHF. She also serves as an assistant coach for the Northern Cyclones, the first female coach in USPHL history.

Career 

Flanagan was originally a figure skater before switching to hockey. In high school, she served as captain for the girls hockey team at the National Sports Academy (Lake Placid, New York).

Across 157 games in the NCAA, she put up 72 points. With Boston College, she won Hockey East championships in 2016 and 2017, as well as Beanpot championships in 2016 and 2017. She took a leave for the 2017-18 season so she could train for the US Olympic team. When she returned for her final season with the college, she served as team co-captain and was named a 2018-19 Hockey East Third Team All-Star.

She was drafted 5th overall by the Boston Pride in the 2018 NWHL Draft. In May 2019, she joined the newly formed Professional Women's Hockey Players Association (PWHPA) and was one of the team captains during the  Dream Gap Tour in Hudson, New Hampshire, in autumn. She was one of the PWHPA players who took part in the 2020 ECHL All-Star Game, where she picked up a goal and an assist. Flanagan signed with the Boston Pride on December 2, 2021, after not making the final roster for the 2022 Olympic Team.

International 

She participated at the 2017 IIHF Women's World Championship and at the 2018 Winter Olympics. During the 2018 Olympics, Flanagan helped Team USA win their first gold medal since 1998 in a shootout win over Team Canada. She competed for Team Americas at the 2019 Aurora Games.

Personal life 

She was raised in Burlington, Massachusetts. Her father, Bill Flanagan, had played ice hockey for Rensselaer Polytechnic Institute, and her cousin Baye Flanagan played for Merrimack College.

References

External links

1995 births
Living people
American women's ice hockey defensemen
People from Burlington, Massachusetts
Sportspeople from Middlesex County, Massachusetts
Boston College Eagles women's ice hockey players
Ice hockey coaches from Massachusetts
Ice hockey players at the 2018 Winter Olympics
Medalists at the 2018 Winter Olympics
Olympic gold medalists for the United States in ice hockey
Professional Women's Hockey Players Association players
Ice hockey players from Massachusetts